"Rock 'n' Roll Mercenaries" is a song by Meat Loaf and John Parr, which was released in 1986 as the lead single from Meat Loaf's fifth studio album Blind Before I Stop. The song was written by Al Hodge and Michael Dan Ehmig, and produced by Frank Farian.

Background
In a 1986 interview with Record Mirror, Meat Loaf said of the song's message, "It's about the music business. It's about people who do it, but they aren't true to themselves. The perfect example is Deep Purple, last year. That's the perfect example of a rock 'n' roll mercenary. 'Let's take the money and run'."

Critical reception
On its release, Lucy O'Brien of New Musical Express considered "Rock 'n' Roll Mercenaries" to be "a run-of-the-mill guitar-befuddled manifestation of the American dream". Chris Roberts of Sounds commented, "What a pair of paunches. Loser meets loser. Result: dead loss." In a review of its single release in the US, Billboard described the song as a "hard rock indictment".

Personnel
Meat Loaf — lead vocals, backing vocals, additional guitars
John Parr — guest vocals
Mats Björklynd — guitars, keys, programming
Johan Daansen — guitars
Peter Weihe — guitars
Dieter Petereit — bass
John Golden — bass
Harry Baierl — keyboards, programming
Pit Löw — keyboards and programming
Curt Cress — drums
Amy Goff — backing vocals
Frank Farian — additional vocals
Peter Bischof — vocals
Bert Gebhard — vocals
Bimey Oberreit — vocals
Elaine Goff — vocals

Track listing 
 "Rock 'n' Roll Mercenaries" (Exploded Version)
 "R.P.M."

Charts

References

Songs about rock music
Meat Loaf songs
John Parr songs
1986 singles
Song recordings produced by Frank Farian
1986 songs
Arista Records singles